Parkhill is an unincorporated community in Cambria County, Pennsylvania, United States. Parkhill has a post office, with ZIP code 15945.

References

Unincorporated communities in Cambria County, Pennsylvania
Unincorporated communities in Pennsylvania